PPW may refer to:

the IATA code for Papa Westray Airport
Performance per watt
Power Pro Wrestling - Memphis, Tennessee based professional wrestling promotion
Protracted people's war - Revolutionary combat theory developed by Mao Zedong
Parody Pro wrestling - wrestling satirical news.